The 1903 SAFA Grand Final was an Australian rules football game contested between  and the  Football Club at the Adelaide Oval on 12 September 1903. It was the 8th instalment of the Grand Final of the South Australian Football Association, staged to determine the premiers for the 1903 SAFA season. The match, attended by 14,000 spectators, was won by Port Adelaide by a margin of 7 points, marking the club's first premiership in its Wharf Pylon guernsey and the club's fourth SAFA premiership victory overall.

Teams

References 

SANFL Grand Finals
SAFA Grand Final, 1903